Lehragaga is a town and a municipal council in Sangrur district in the Indian state of Punjab. It is near the border of Punjab and Haryana. Haryana is about 15 km from Lehragaga. It has a railway station. In lehragaga there are many schools, colleges and financial institutes.

To distinguish it from the other Lehras in Punjab, its name had been modified with the addition of Gaga (an adjoining village). Lehragaga is a block, sub-division and vidhan-sabha constituency as well.

History

Lehragaga was the part of the princely state of Patiala, founded by Baba Ala Singh. Barbaric Muslim rulers were assassinated by Bhai ManiSingh from this place. After that, a Gurudwara was constructed here. Here, a fair is also held to honor of the memory of Bhai mani Singh. Lehragaga was named by Mohan Garg. He was very kind to poor people; if someone had any kind of problem, then he helps them with money or other things as the person needed. That is why it is called

"lehro lehr samundar aye jaye jaha Mohan ka was;
Inder barse apni rut, or Mohan charo mas..."

Lehragaga is a religious city with a lot of temples and gurudwaras. It is a city of the middle-class people who have a good work ethic.

Cultural and social
There is a railway station in the city that lies on Ludhiana-Hisar railway line. This line divides the city into two parts.

Demographics
 India census, Lehragaga had a population of 22,588 of which 12,003 were male, 10,585 were female and 2,710 under 6 years of age. 15,052 were literate; 8,621 males and  6,431 females.

Politics
It is part of the Lehra Assembly constituency.

Education

 Academic Heights Public School khokhar Lehragaga. 
 Aryabhatta College of Pharmacy: Sunam Road, Lehragaga. 
 Baba Hira Singh Bhattal Institute of Engineering and Technology: Sunam-Lehra-Jakhal Road, Lehragaga.  
 Babu Baghirth Lal Industrial Training Institute: Railway Road, Lehragaga. 
 Bachpan a play school Punjabi Bagh colony Lehragaga
 Dr. Dev Raj D.A.V. Public School, Khai, Lehragaga
 Guru Angad Dev College for Women: Lehal Khurd, Lehragaga. 
 Guru Gobind Singh College of Arts, Science and Commerce: Khokhar Kalan, Lehragaga. 
 Guru Teg Bahadur College of Education: Lehar Khurd, Lehragaga. 
 Holy Mission International School, Lehragaga
 Jasmer Singh Jaijee Post Graduate College: Gurney Kalan, Jakhal Road, Lehragaga. 
 Krishna College of Pharmacy:Jakhal Road, Lehragaga.
 KCT College of Engineering and Technology, Lehra-Cheema Road, VPO Fatehgarh, Lehragaga. 
 Lehra Institutes of Advance Studies, Colony Road Lehragaga
 Lord Krishna College of Pharmacy: Sunam Road, Khokhar Kalan, Lehragaga. 
 Lord Krishna Technical Institute: Baba Mast Ram Gita Bhawan Road, Lehragaga.
 Maharaja Aggarsain College of Pharmacy: Sunam Road, Lehragaga.
 Sai College of Education and Pharmacy: Sunam Road, Changaliwala, Lehragaga. 
 SEABA International Public School, Sunam Road
 Shivam College of Education:Sunam Road, Khokhar Kalan, Lehragaga. 
 Vidya Jyoti College of Nursing: Kotra Lehal, Jakhal Road, Lehragaga. 
 Vidya Rattan Group of Colleges:Sunam Road, Khokhar Kalan, Lehragaga. 
 Vidya Sagar Paramedical College: Jakhal Road, Lehragaga. 
 Vinayak College of Pharmacy: Gobindpura-Jawaharwala, Jakhal Road, Lehragaga.

Nearby villages
Notable nearby villages include:-

Balran
Changali Wala
Dirba
 Gaga
Haryau
Khai
Lehal Kalan 
Rampura Jawaharwala

Adjacent communities

References

Cities and towns in Sangrur district